Ian William Wilson (born 27 March 1958) is a former Scottish international football player and football manager.

Playing career
Ian Wilson's first professional club was his hometown club of Aberdeen F.C. where he spent one season and never played in a competitive first team game.  On having received a free transfer from Aberdeen, Ian signed for Dundee F.C. and again only lasted one season where once again he never featured in a competitive first team game.  After being freed by Dundee, Ian moved to then Highland Football League club Elgin City. In 1977, Wilson played for Elgin in a good Scottish Cup run which ended with a 3.0 defeat to Rangers at Ibrox.  Ian also featured in a Highland Football League Select which were selected to play against Buckie Thistle F.C. to commemorate the opening of Buckie's floodlights in 1978.

Wilson was signed by Leicester City in April 1979 for a Highland Football League record breaking transfer fee at that time, of £20,000.  He is among some of the longest serving Leicester City players and captained the side during a successful eight years at the club. Wilson left to Filbert Street in September 1987 when new Everton boss Colin Harvey signed him for £300,000. His finest moment at Everton was playing in the 1989 FA Cup Final in a 3-2 defeat to Liverpool, when he came on as a second-half substitute. Two seasons later, he signed for Istanbul giants Beşiktaş and, in his only season there, won both the Turkish League Championship and the Turkish Cup.

Wilson was capped five times at senior level for Scotland, all during 1987.

Managerial career
In 1993, immediately after leaving Wigan Athletic in the first half of the season, he became Player Manager of then Highland Football League club  Peterhead F.C. where he guided them into a promotion-challenging position in each season of his three-and-a-half-year reign.  He then moved to Japan to join Nagoya Grampus Eight as assistant manager to his former Leicester Manager Gordon Milne. He returned in 1995 before again leaving to join up with Milne, this time at Turkish club Beşiktaş J.K.

Wilson had a weekly column in the Aberdeen Evening Express entitled 'Wilson's World'. After this ended, he continued running his soccer schools in Aberdeen, which have been going since 1999. The schools develop and coach youngsters from age 4 to 14 years.  The schools are well established in Aberdeen and the Grampian area.  More recently, Wilson also has soccer schools setup in the Marmaris area of Turkey.

Honours
Leicester City
Football League Second Division : 1979–80

Everton
Full Members Cup Runner-up : 1988–89

Beşiktaş
Süper Lig : 1989–90
Turkish Cup : 1989–90
Turkish Super Cup : 1989

References

External links
 Ian Wilson Soccer Coaching
 
 
 

1958 births
Living people
Footballers from Aberdeen
Scottish footballers
Scottish expatriate footballers
Scotland international footballers
Scotland B international footballers
Scottish football managers
Peterhead F.C. managers
Dundee F.C. players
Leicester City F.C. players
Everton F.C. players
Derby County F.C. players
Wigan Athletic F.C. players
Bury F.C. players
Beşiktaş J.K. footballers
Peterhead F.C. players
English Football League players
Süper Lig players
Expatriate footballers in Turkey
Scottish Football League managers
Aberdeen F.C. players
Elgin City F.C. players
Highland Football League players
Association football midfielders
FA Cup Final players
Scottish expatriate sportspeople in Turkey
Highland Football League managers